A dvandva ('pair' in Sanskrit) is a linguistic compound in which multiple individual nouns are concatenated to form an agglomerated compound word in which the conjunction has been elided to form a new word with a distinct semantic field. For instance, the individual words 'brother' and 'sister' may in some languages be agglomerated to 'brothersister' to express "siblings". The grammatical number of such constructs is often plural or dual. 

The term dvandva was borrowed from Sanskrit, a language in which these compounds are common. Dvandvas also exist in Avestan, the Old Iranian language related to Sanskrit, as well as in numerous Indo-Aryan languages descended from the Prakrits. Several far-eastern languages such as Chinese, Japanese, Atong (a Tibeto-Burman language of India and Bangladesh) and Korean also have dvandvas. Dvandvas may also be found occasionally in European languages, but are relatively rare.

Examples include:
 Sanskrit mātāpitarau "parents" (lit. 'mother-father').
  and Japanese , for "landscape, scenery" (lit. "mountains and rivers").
 Georgian:  (ded-mama) (lit. mother-father) for parents,  (da-ʒma) (lit. sister-brother) for siblings
 Modern Greek   for "cutlery" (lit. "fork-knife"),   for "married couple" (lit. "husband-wife").
 Finnic maa-ilma ("land-air") for "world".
 Friulian marimont ("sea-world") for "the entire world, the universe".
 Atong achu-ambi ("grandfather-grandmother") for "ancestors".
 Azerbaijani ər-arvad ("husband-wife") for "married couple".
 Basque anai-arrebak ("brothers and sisters").
 Yiddish  tatemame (papa-mama) for "parents".

Dvandvas should not be confused with agglutination, which also concatenates words but is a different process.

Sanskrit
There are two or three kinds of dvandva compounds in Sanskrit, depending on classification.

Itaretara dvandva
The first, and most common kind, the itaretara (<itara-itara) dvandva, is an enumerative compound word, the meaning of which refers to all its constituent members. The resultant compound word is in the dual or plural depending on the total number of described individuals. It takes the gender of the final member in the compound construction. Examples:
 rāma-lakṣmaṇau (dual) "Rama and Lakshmana"
 Hariharau (dual) "Hari and Hara (Shiva)"
 ācārya-śiṣyau (dual) 'teacher and student'
 rāma-lakṣmaṇa-bharata-śatrughnāh (plural) "Rama, Lakshmana, Bharata and Shatrughna"
 nar-āśva-ratha-dantinaḥ (plural) "men, horses, chariots, and elephants"
 deva-manuṣyāḥ (plural) "gods and humans"

Compare Greek Αβαρόσλαβοι  "the Avars and the Slavs (two distinct tribes acting as a unit)", similarly with case and number marking displayed only on the last part of the compound, the first having the form of the word root)

Itaretaras formed from two kinship terms behave differently, in that the first word is not in the compound form but in the nominative (singular). 
 mātā-pitarau "mother and father"

Samāhāra dvandva
The second, rarer kind is called samāhāra dvandva and is a collective compound word, the meaning of which refers to the collection of its constituent members. The resultant compound word is in the singular number and is always neuter in gender. Examples:
 pāṇipādam 'limbs', literally 'hands and feet', from pāṇi 'hand' and pāda 'foot'

Compare Modern Greek ανδρόγυνο  "husband and wife" or μαχαιροπίρουνο  "cutlery" (literally "knife-forks"), similarly always in the neuter singular (plural marking would refer to several couples or cutlery sets).

Ekaśeṣa dvandva
According to some grammarians, there is a third kind called ekaśeṣa dvandva "residual compound". It is formed like an itaretara, but the first constituent is omitted. The remaining final constituent still takes the dual (or plural) number.  According to other grammarians, however, the ekaśeṣa is not properly a compound at all. An example:
 pitarau 'parents', from mātā 'mother' + pitā 'father'

References
 
 

Linguistic morphology
Sanskrit grammar